The Colmeallie stone circle is a recumbent stone circle in Glen Esk, Angus, Scotland. It is located 8 km north of Edzell at Colmeallie Farm, adjacent to the unclassified road leading from the B966 to Tarfside and Loch Lee.

Antiquarian Andrew Jervise recorded in 1853 that elderly locals could remember the circle being more complete, but that it had been recently plundered for building materials.

References

External links
The Megalithic Portal

Stone circles in Angus, Scotland
Scheduled Ancient Monuments in Angus